Uqhu (Quechua for swamp, Hispanicized spelling Uco) or Ukhu (Quechua for deep) is a  mountain in the Cordillera Central in the Andes of Peru. It is located in the Lima Region, Huarochirí Province, on the border of the districts of San Damian and San Mateo. Uqhu is situated northwest of the mountain named Suyruqucha. A little lake called Suyruqucha lies at its feet.

References

Mountains of Peru
Mountains of Lima Region